Doncaster United F.C. was an English association football club based in Doncaster, South Yorkshire.

History

League and cup history

Records
Best FA Amateur Cup performance:

References

Defunct football clubs in England
Defunct football clubs in South Yorkshire
Yorkshire Football League